Jaru Rural District is in Palangabad District of Eshtehard County, Alborz province, Iran. At the most recent census of 2016, it had a population of 1,407 in 445 households. The largest of its 12 villages was Jaru, with 766 people.

References 

Eshtehard County

Rural Districts of Alborz Province

Populated places in Alborz Province

Populated places in Eshtehard County